is a Japanese swimmer, specializing in the medley events. She became the first Japanese woman to dip beneath the 2:08-barrier in the women's 200 metre individual medley event at the 2017 World Aquatics Championships, finishing with a silver-medal time and a national record of 2:07.91. 

Ohashi qualified to represent Japan at the 2020 Summer Olympics. She won Japan's second gold in the 2020 Summer Olympics, winning the Women's 400m individual medley. She also won the gold medal in the Women's 200m individual medley.

See also
 List of multiple Olympic gold medalists at a single Games

References

External links
 

1995 births
Living people
Japanese female freestyle swimmers
Japanese female medley swimmers
World Aquatics Championships medalists in swimming
Universiade medalists in swimming
Swimmers at the 2018 Asian Games
Asian Games medalists in swimming
Asian Games gold medalists for Japan
Asian Games silver medalists for Japan
Medalists at the 2018 Asian Games
Universiade gold medalists for Japan
Medalists at the 2017 Summer Universiade
Olympic swimmers of Japan
Olympic gold medalists for Japan
Medalists at the 2020 Summer Olympics
Swimmers at the 2020 Summer Olympics
Olympic gold medalists in swimming
21st-century Japanese women